Newlands Run is a  long 1st order tributary to Girty Run in Brooke County, West Virginia.  This is the only stream of this name in the United States.

Course
Newlands Run rises about 1.5 miles east-southeast of Power, West Virginia, and then flows southwest to join Girty Run about 0.5 miles east of Windsor Heights.

Watershed
Newlands Run drains  of area, receives about 40.0 in/year of precipitation, has a wetness index of 292.90, and is about 66% forested.

See also
List of rivers of West Virginia

References

Rivers of West Virginia
Rivers of Brooke County, West Virginia